Charles Henry Herbert Cook (30 September 1843–21 May 1910) was an English-born, Australian-raised, New Zealand-based mathematician. He was born in Kentish Town, Middlesex, England on 30 September 1843, but educated in Melbourne, Australia, where he got a BA and an LLB from University of Melbourne. He then went to St John's College, Cambridge, initially to train for the English Bar but became interested in mathematics.

In 1874, a year before being due to be called to the bar, Cook was appointed founding head of mathematics at Canterbury College, University of New Zealand (now Canterbury University). He joined co-founders John Macmillan Brown and Alexander Bickerton in Christchurch, New Zealand and initially focused on Latin and mathematics. He was also involved in promoting the establishment of the University's engineering school. He is remembered primarily for his teaching; Nobel Prize-winning physicist Ernest Rutherford cited him as an influence:  
Cook was evidently a sound mathematician and an excellent teacher along orthodox lines, with no marked tendency to stray from those lines.

He was involved in secondary education, acting as an examiner for the New Zealand Department of Education and holding a fellowship at the Anglican Christ's College, Christchurch from 1891 to 1908.

Cook was a member of the Royal Commission on Higher Education 1878–1800 and a member of the senate of the University of New Zealand.

In 1903, Cook appeared in the vanity press The Cyclopedia of New Zealand, with a photo and short article. He died in Marton, New Zealand on 21 May 1910.

Cook Memorial Prize
After his death in 1910 a memorial prize was established, with Ernest Rutherford among the contributors.

References

1843 births
1910 deaths
English emigrants to New Zealand
University of Melbourne alumni
Alumni of St John's College, Cambridge
Academic staff of the University of Canterbury
New Zealand mathematicians
New Zealand Anglicans